Leirungskampen is a mountain in Vågå Municipality in Innlandet county, Norway. The mountain is surrounded by several other notable mountains including Leirungstinden to the north Kalvehøgde and Rasletinden to the east, Torfinnstindene to the southwest, and Kvitskardtinden and Mesmogtinden to the west.

See also
List of mountains of Norway by height

References

Jotunheimen
Vågå
Mountains of Innlandet